The 1967 BC Lions finished in fifth place in the Western Conference with a 3–12–1 record after Joe Kapp, Willie Fleming, Tom Hinton, Pat Claridge, Jim Carphin and Dick Fouts left the team following the conclusion of the 1966 season. 

During the off-season, Herb Capozzi was replaced with new General Manager Denny Veitch.  

Former Hamilton star pivot Bernie Faloney was brought in to replace Kapp. It was Faloney's final year of professional football, and while he threw for a career best 3303 yards, he also threw 21 interceptions and was sacked 35 times. After losing their first five games, Grey Cup winning head coach Dave Skrien was replaced by interim coach Ron Morris and then by Jim Champion. The team was characterized by its lack of offense, only averaging 14.9 points and 1.5 touchdowns per game.  

The poor field goal kicking from the previous season resulted in the Lions being the first team to use a specialist kicker in the CFL. Although Ted Gerela did backup at running back, he did represent the transition in the CFL from the era when a regular positional player did the kicking and the era of kickers who do nothing but kick.

Veteran linebacker Norm Fieldgate, who had played with the team since the 1954 expansion, retired at the end of the season after 223 games.

The Lions introduced a new helmet logo: a roaring lion's head with BC inscribed on the cheek. This would be the team's primary mark for the 'lost decade' of Lions football from 1967 to 1977 where the team won more than six games only twice.

Regular season

Season standings

Season schedule

Offensive leaders

Awards and records

1967 CFL All-Stars
None

References

BC Lions seasons
1967 Canadian Football League season by team
1967 in British Columbia